Taneytown Historic District is a national historic district at Taneytown, Carroll County, Maryland, United States.  The district comprises a cohesive group of houses, churches, commercial buildings and industrial structures reflecting the development of this crossroads town from its initial platting in 1762 through the early 20th century.

It was added to the National Register of Historic Places in 1986.

References

External links
, including photo from 1986, at Maryland Historical Trust
Boundary Map of the Taneytown Historic District, Carroll County, at Maryland Historical Trust

Historic districts in Carroll County, Maryland
Historic districts on the National Register of Historic Places in Maryland
Victorian architecture in Maryland
Taneytown, Maryland
National Register of Historic Places in Carroll County, Maryland